Shosh (Shoshana) Riseman (or Raizman, ; born 10 April 1948) is an Israeli music educator, stage director and composer.

Biography
Riseman was born in Cyprus while her parents were traveling, and graduated from the Tel Aviv Academy of Music in 1970. She studied composition and orchestration with Noam Sheriff, Leon Shidlovsky and Yosef Dorfman at Tel Aviv University in Israel, with Hans Heimler, at Guilford University in England, and Ralph Shapy, Chicago University in the USA. She also studied electroacoustic music with Sanday and voice with Mira Zakai and Hanna Hacohen at Tel Aviv University. She teaches theater arts at Tel Aviv University, Ramat Aviv, Israel, and is known as a composer of theater music.

Honors and awards
1969 - America Israel Culture Fund prize
1986 - First prize for the music to "Hymn for David", Acre Festival
1987 - Special prize, Acre Festival
2001 - Nominee for Israeli Theater Prize

Works
Riseman has composed music for about fifty plays. Selected works include:

1972 - The Good Soldier Svejk, operetta
1972 - Background music for the Media, KPM Records, London
1973 - Shchunat Chaim, for television
1976 - What a Lovely Day, CBS Records
1983 - 9 Haiku Songs
1987 - Avishai Milshtein, Then is Death
1989 - Euripides - Iphigenia at Aulis, Seminar Hakibutzim, The Kibutz
1990 - Sam Sheperd, Love/Death, Tetroneto
1992 - The Toledo Girls, opera, Libretto: Joshua Sobol
1999 - Dylan Thomas, Under Milk Wood
2001 - Oscar Wild, The Rose and the Nightingale, opera, Libretto: Moshe Prives
Everything is Here, musical

References

1948 births
20th-century classical composers
Israeli composers
Israeli music educators
Jewish classical composers
Living people
Women classical composers
21st-century classical composers
20th-century Israeli educators
20th-century Israeli women musicians
21st-century Israeli educators
21st-century Israeli women musicians
Women music educators
20th-century women composers
21st-century women composers
20th-century women educators
21st-century women educators